Vito Ernesto Gasparrini Domínguez (born December 17, 1975, in Caracas, Venezuela) is a Venezuelan model who won the title of Mister Venezuela in 2006. He was also represented Mérida state in Mister Venezuela 2003. He was the official representative of Venezuela in the Mister World 2007 pageant in Sanya, China.

References

External links
Vito Gasparrini profile at missandmr.com

Male beauty pageant winners
Living people
1975 births